The Amber Coast is the name given to a coastal strip of the Baltic Sea in the northwest of Kaliningrad (Russia, Kaliningrad Oblast, Sambia Peninsula, formerly northern East Prussia in Germany). In this area amber (Baltic amber) has been excavated since the mid-19th century and up to today in open-pit mining. Two deposits – Palmnikenskoe and Primorskoe, containing 80% of world amber reserves, were found near Yantarny on the Western coast of the Sambia Peninsula in 1948-1951’s.

History
Scientists believe that amber was deposited during the Upper Eocene and Lower Oligocene in a delta of a prehistoric river, in a shallow part of a marine basin. In addition to the coast near Kaliningrad, amber is also found elsewhere in the Baltic Sea region. The deposits are found mostly in the "blue earth glauconite", a layer 1 to 17.5 meters thick found 25 to 40 meters from the surface. In addition to the Sambia region, amber is gathered in noticeable amounts at German, Polish and Lithuanian Baltic beaches (areas of the Bay of Gdańsk as well as the Vistula Lagoon), the western coast of Denmark and the Frisian Islands. Small amounts of  Baltic amber can even be found outside the Baltic region, for example on the coastline of the south east of England.

However, about 90% to 98% of all output of amber has been produced in the Sambia region (now a Russian exclave, formerly in Eastern Prussia and the Polish–Lithuanian Commonwealth). The Sambian amber-producing region is a square of about 30–40 km (20–25 miles), although geologists estimate there are deposits beyond the region of the main excavations. A potential nearby source of amber is the Courish Lagoon.  Amber excavation is overseen by the Russian Amber Company (Ruskij Jantar).

The Amber Coast is mentioned as early as by Tacitus in his work Germania.

Other uses
Another coastal strip referred to as “amber coast” is the Costa de Ambar (also known as “Costambar”) in the west of Puerto Plata (Hispaniola, Dominican Republic). In this area there are a number of small shaft mines, from which is excavated the so-called "Dominican amber". The Dominican amber production site is the world's second-largest, although compared to the Baltic region it is "a distant second".

References

External links
 Amber deposits
 The Economic History of Amber
 Baltic Amber

Amber
Coasts of Russia
Landforms of Kaliningrad Oblast
Historical regions